St. Luke's Episcopal Church is a historic Episcopal church located at Jerusalem in Yates County, New York. It is a Gothic Revival style structure built about 1867.

It was listed on the National Register of Historic Places in 1994.

References

Churches on the National Register of Historic Places in New York (state)
Episcopal church buildings in New York (state)
Gothic Revival church buildings in New York (state)
Churches completed in 1867
19th-century Episcopal church buildings
Churches in Yates County, New York
National Register of Historic Places in Yates County, New York